Jiří Jirmal (24 April 1925 – 11 December 2019) was a classical guitarist who also was dedicated to jazz.

He was born as Jiří Novák in Prague. Some of his compositions incorporate elements of Brazilian music (e.g. Bossa Nova, Samba). He contributed the musical background for Gene Deitch's 1962 Tom and Jerry cartoon Tall in the Trap, in which he was credited as George Jirmal.

External links
Jiri Jirmal - guitar player, teacher and composer

1925 births
2019 deaths
Czech classical guitarists
Male guitarists
Jazz guitarists
Musicians from Prague
Academic staff of the Prague Conservatory
20th-century classical musicians